The 2011 Canadian Figure Skating Championships were held from January 17 to 23, 2011 in Victoria, British Columbia. The event determines the national champions of Canada and is organized by Skate Canada, the nation's figure skating governing body. The junior-level and senior-level events were held at the Save-On-Foods Memorial Centre. Skaters competed at the senior, junior, and novice levels in the disciplines of men's singles, women's singles, pair skating, and ice dancing. Although the official International Skating Union terminology for female skaters in the singles category is ladies, Skate Canada uses women officially. The results of this competition were used to pick the Canadian teams for the 2011 World Championships, the 2011 Four Continents Championships, and the 2011 World Junior Championships, as well as the Canadian national team.

The novice event had been held separately in previous years; the last time it was held with the senior events was 1997.

Schedule

Senior results

Men

Women

Pairs

Ice dancing

Junior results

Men

Women

Pairs

Ice dancing

Novice results

Men

Women

Pairs

Ice dancing

References

External links

 2011 Canadian Figure Skating Championships senior results at SkateCanada.ca
 
 
 Junior-level results
 Senior starting orders

Canadian Figure Skating Championships
Figure skating
Figure Skating Championships
Canadian Figure Skating Championships
Sports competitions in Victoria, British Columbia
Canadian Figure Skating Championships